Ryan Hayes (born February 28, 2000) is an American football offensive tackle for the Michigan Wolverines.

Early life and high school career
Hayes attended Traverse City West Senior High School where he was a two-way, three-sport athlete in high school. He played basketball, baseball and football, where he was as an all-state tight end and defensive end. He was a four-star recruit and ranked as the No. 10 offensive tackle in the nation. He received offers from Michigan, Michigan State, Notre Dame, TCU, Vanderbilt and Virginia.

College career
Hayes enrolled at Michigan in 2018, but did not appear in any games. Prior to his sophomore season, head coach Jim Harbaugh announced that Hayes would backup Jalen Mayfield and Jon Runyan Jr.. As a sophomore in 2019, he played 12 games on the offensive line, including two starts. He made his collegiate debut on August 31, 2019, in a game against Middle Tennessee. He started at left tackle in place of fifth-year senior Runyan, who sat out due to an injury. He was the team's swing tackle after Runyan returned from injury. As a junior in 2020, he started the first two games at left tackle, however, he missed the remainder of the season due to injury, in a season that was shortened due to the COVID-19 pandemic.

As a senior in 2021 he started all 14 games at left tackle and helped lead the offensive line with the fewest sacks allowed (10) and third-fewest tackles for loss (27) nationally and won the Joe Moore Award. Following the season he was named second-team All-Big Ten. As a graduate student in 2022, he started 11 games, after missing the first game of the season due to injury. He helped lead the offensive line with 12 sacks allowed and a 5.97 sack-adjusted yards per carry, and was named a semifinalist for the Joe Moore Award. Following the season he was again named second-team All-Big Ten. On November 21, 2022, he accepted an invite to the Senior Bowl.

References

External links
 Michigan Wolverines bio

2000 births
Living people
American football offensive tackles
Michigan Wolverines football players
People from Traverse City, Michigan
Players of American football from Michigan